The Logan Mills Gristmill is a historic grist mill located at Logan Township in Clinton County, Pennsylvania. It was built in about 1840, and is a 3 1/2-story, coursed stone building with a tin-covered gable roof.  It is three bays by four bays.  It includes most of its original machinery.  It was powered by water diverted from Fishing Creek.

It was listed on the National Register of Historic Places in 1980.

References 

Grinding mills on the National Register of Historic Places in Pennsylvania
Industrial buildings completed in 1840
Buildings and structures in Clinton County, Pennsylvania
Grinding mills in Pennsylvania
National Register of Historic Places in Clinton County, Pennsylvania